Markham—Thornhill is a federal electoral district in Ontario, Canada, that has been represented in the House of Commons of Canada since 2015. It encompasses a portion of Ontario previously included in the electoral districts of Markham—Unionville and Thornhill.

Markham—Thornhill was created by 2012 federal electoral boundaries redistribution and was legally defined in the 2013 representation order. It came into effect upon the dropping of the writs for the 2015 federal election.

Demographics
Markham—Thornhill loses more people than any other federal electoral district in the 905 region. The population in 2016 was 99,078 which is a 3.1% drop from 102,221 in 2011.

According to the Canada 2021 Census

Ethnic groups: 42.8% Chinese, 27.5% South Asian, 12.7% White, 3.8% Black, 2.7% Filipino, 3.0% West Asian, 1.3% Korean
Languages: 29.5% English, 18.7% Cantonese, 13.8% Mandarin, 7.6% Tamil, 3.1% Urdu, 2.3% Punjabi, 2.0% Persian, 1.9% Gujarati, 1.3% Tagalog, 1.0% Korean 
Religions: 28.2% Christian (13.5% Catholic, 2.4% Christian Orthodox, 1.0% Anglican, 11.3% Other), 14.3% Hindu, 10.8% Muslim, 4.7% Buddhist, 3.1% Jewish, 2.2% Sikh, 36.1% None
Median income: $32,400 (2020) 
Average income: $47,640 (2020)

Members of Parliament

This riding has elected the following Members of Parliament:

Election results

2021 general election

2019 general election

2017 by-election
A by-election was held on April 3, 2017, following John McCallum's appointment as Ambassador to China on January 10, 2017.

2015 general election

References 

Ontario federal electoral districts
Politics of Markham, Ontario
2013 establishments in Ontario